Looking Back, also later known as Anthology, is a triple LP anthology by American soul musician Stevie Wonder, released in 1977 on Motown Records. Since its release in 12-inch triple LP format, it has not been reissued and is considered a limited edition. The album chronicles 40 songs from Wonder's first Motown period, which precedes the classic period of his critically acclaimed albums.

Overview

Between 1963 and the end of 1971, Wonder placed over 25 songs on Billboard Hot 100. Twenty-four of those — including such radio staples as "Fingertips, Pt. 2", "Uptight (Everything's Alright)", "I Was Made to Love Her", "For Once in My Life", "My Cherie Amour", and "Signed, Sealed, Delivered I'm Yours" — appear on Looking Back. Wonder's recordings in the '60s stand apart from most Motown acts partially because he was paired with producers and writers who very rarely worked with the Temptations, Supremes, etc. In his early years, Wonder was often produced by Clarence Paul and/or William Stevenson and, during the golden years, by Henry Cosby. Then in 1970, Wonder started producing himself, beginning with Signed, Sealed & Delivered. Most of his singles were written by Wonder himself in tandem with a variety of others, or by Ron Miller. The hits alternated between stomping barn-burners and mid-tempo, understated ballads.

Before the long-awaited Wonder box set, At the Close of a Century, was issued, this triple-album set was the ultimate early Wonder collection. It contains every major hit and many other vital singles from 1962–1971, showing his evolution from Ray Charles' disciple to assembly-line hitmaker to individualistic artist. Unlike its other anthologies, which have been carved down from three-volume vinyl LPs to double-disc sets, Motown simply deleted this one altogether, although vigilant collectors may be able to obtain it through used record stores. It wouldn't be until 1999's At the Close of a Century that another Stevie Wonder anthology which included material from this period would be released.

This compilation marks the first release of Stevie Wonder's 1967 original recording of "Until You Come Back To Me (That's What I'm Gonna Do)," which was a 1973 hit for Aretha Franklin.  It's also the only collection of his to feature material from his instrumental album Eivets Rednow.

Critical reception 
In a contemporary review, Russell Gersten of The Village Voice wrote that, although it suffers from some poorly chosen material and omissions, the album is ultimately an "essential record" that "requires a bit more imagination and knowledge to appreciate than most anthologies, but the raw ingredients are there. Wonder worked in an era of excesses, and his fight to find meaning is—in its own modest way—uplifting." The newspaper's Robert Christgau shared a similar sentiment and said that Looking Back is at the same time "flawed, long overdue, and essential." He later included it in his "basic record library" of 1970s albums, published in Christgau's Record Guide: Rock Albums of the Seventies.

In a retrospective review for Allmusic, writer Rob Bowman gave Looking Back five stars and said that Wonder's songs from the 1960s were unique from most other Motown artists because he had a hand in writing them and his producers rarely collaborated with acts such as the Temptations or the Supremes. J. D. Considine, writing in The Rolling Stone Album Guide (1992), gave the album four-and-a-half out of five stars and felt that it is a significantly better compilation than Greatest Hits Vol. 2 (1971) because of how it highlights both his studio albums up to that point and several non-LP singles.

Track listing

Side one
 "Thank You (For Loving Me All the Way)" – 2:30
 "Contract on Love" – 2:02
 "Fingertips - Part 2" – 2:52
 "Workout Stevie, Workout" – 2:40
 "Castles in the Sand" – 2:10
 "Hey Harmonica Man" – 2:35
 "High Heel Sneakers" – 2:58

Side two
 "Uptight (Everything's Alright)" – 2:53
 "Nothing's Too Good for My Baby" – 2:38
 "Blowin' in the Wind" – 3:45
 "Ain't That Asking for Trouble" – 2:47
 "I'd Cry" – 2:22
 "A Place in the Sun" – 2:52
 "Sylvia" – 2:33

Side three
 "Down to Earth" – 2:48
 "Thank You Love" – 2:50
 "Hey Love" – 2:44
 "Travelin' Man" – 2:54
 "Until You Come Back to Me (That's What I'm Gonna Do)" – 3:06
 "I Was Made to Love Her" – 2:35
 "I'm Wondering" – 2:52

Side four
 "Shoo-Be-Doo-Be-Doo-Da-Day" – (2:44)
 "You Met Your Match" – (2:36)
 "I'd Be a Fool Right Now" (New 1977 mix) – (2:53)
 "Alfie" – (2:58)
 "More Than a Dream" – (3:20)
 "For Once in My Life" – (2:16)

Side five
 "Angie Girl" – 2:56
 "My Cherie Amour" – 2:54
 "I Don't Know Why (I Love You)" – 2:43
 "If I Ruled The World" – 3:31
 "Yester-Me, Yester-You, Yesterday" – 2:57
 "Never Had a Dream Come True" – 2:59
 "Signed, Sealed, Delivered I'm Yours" – 2:46

Side six
 "Heaven Help Us All" – 2:59
 "I Gotta Have a Song" – 2:32
 "Never Dreamed You'd Leave in Summer" – 2:56
 "If You Really Love Me" – 2:53
 "Something Out of the Blue" – 2:58
 "Do Yourself a Favor" – 5:58

Personnel
Stevie Wonder vocals, piano, harmonica, keyboards, clavinet, drums, bongos, percussion
The Andantes background vocals
Syreeta Wright vocals
Marvin Gaye drums
Larry Moses bass
The Funk Brothers instrumentation

Production

Charts

Certifications

References

External links
 

1977 compilation albums
Stevie Wonder compilation albums
Motown compilation albums
Albums produced by Henry Cosby
Albums produced by Stevie Wonder
Albums produced by William "Mickey" Stevenson
Albums produced by Clarence Paul
Albums recorded at Hitsville U.S.A.
Albums produced by Hal Davis
Albums produced by Berry Gordy
Albums produced by Johnny Bristol
Albums produced by Brian Holland
Albums produced by Lamont Dozier